Lepidogma minimalis is a species of snout moth in the genus Lepidogma. It was described by George Hampson in 1916 and is known from Sri Lanka (including the type location, Perdeniya).

References

Moths described in 1916
Epipaschiinae